Anthraconite (also spelled as anthraxonite) or stinkstone is a form of black to grey, bituminous bearing marble, calcite or limestone which produces an unpleasant odour when struck or rubbed.  It is thought to have been formed when limestone is deposited under anaerobic conditions. Some anthraconite releases enough petroleum when struck, that it may be lit. At least one locality where it is found is in the vicinity of Traverse City, Michigan.

References

Further reading
 1989. "Origin and usage of the geological terms orsten, stinkstone, and anthraconite." Archives Of Natural History 16, no. 2: 191. Supplemental Index, EBSCOhost (accessed February 5, 2013).

Limestone
Marble
Bitumen-impregnated rocks